Mihai Coșcodan is a Moldovan University Professor, scientist, politician. He was member of the Moldovan Parliament in 1990–1994.

Biography 

Mihai Coșcodan  was born October 17, 1940, in Năpădeni, Ungheni district, in the former Moldavian SSR. He was a member of the first Parliament of the Republic of Moldova 1990-1994 (1990 Moldovan parliamentary election) and it is one of the signers of  Declaration of Independence, the Government, in diplomatic mission.

Facts 

As the newspaper "Sovereign Moldova" of 10 December 1991, despite the prohibitions imposed by  Smirnov in Transnistria in many places it was still possible opening of polling stations. And this happened not only in rural areas with ethnic Romanian majority, but even in Tiraspol, a polling station was opened in the premises of the local Pedagogical Institute. This was possible thanks to the courage shown by the rector of the institution, Mihai Coşcodan, and his deputy, Peter Tolocenco.

The Moscow edition newspaper "Izvestia" wrote of 10 December 1991 that "although (Snegur) had counter-elections can be considered an overwhelming victory." Already the afternoon of December 8 participated in the vote about. 60 percent of citizens voting. Moscow correspondent newspaper also reported that not only Moldovans, i.e. those of Romanian nationality and minorities voted for Snegur, this is true in southern localities inhabited mostly by the  Gagauz, but also in Transnistria. In other words, citizens of different ethnicities namely Snegur saw him as a guarantor of stability and reconciliation.

Education 

Tiraspol State Pedagogical Institute "Taras Shevchenko" (present Tiraspol State University, UST), specialty - teacher of geography and biology, Ph.D., associate professor.
Since 1965 - assistant and graduate student of physics at the geographic Tiraspol Pedagogical Institute and the Lviv University

He served as member of the Parliament of Moldova, Government of Moldova, diplomatic mission.

Career 

 Since 1965 works at the department of General Geography, State University of Tiraspol (State Pedagogical Institute T.G. Shevchenko)
 1970-1977 - Head of the Department of General Geography and Cartography, State University of Tiraspol (T.G. Shevchenko State Pedagogical Institute)
 1977-1987 - Dean, Faculty of Geography Tiraspol State University
 1987-1992 - Rector of the Tiraspol State University
 May 1992 - 1994 - Deputy Prime Minister of the Republic of Moldova (in Valeriu Muravschi Cabinet 28.05.1991 - 01.07.1992 and Andrei Sangheli Cabinet 01.07.1992 - 05.04.1994)
 1994-1998 - Ambassador of the Republic of Moldova in Bulgaria (27 June 1994 – 28 July 1998), Ambassador of the Republic of Moldova in Federal Republic of Yugoslavia (2 May 1995 – 28 July 1998), Ambassador of the Republic of Moldova in Republic of Macedonia (? – 28 July 1998).
 1998-     - Deputy Rector of the Free International University of Moldova
  - -  Head of Department of Soil Science, Geology and Geography, PhD in Geography, Associate Professor (Rom: Şef de catedră "Ştiinţe ale Solului, Geologie şi Geografie", doctor în geografie, conferenţiar universitar). Moldova State University
 2016 - Department of Soil Science, Geography, Geology, Forestry and Design, PhD in biology, professor. USM Senate member.

Honour

 Order of the Republic (Moldova) nr.0377
 Medal „Meritul Civic” nr.00853
 България, Мадарски конник (орден) първа степен, Указ 234 (Bulgaria, 07.07.1998). BG wiki: Носители на орден „Мадарски конник“

Main publications 

 Опыт микроклиматической арактеристики природных территориальных комплексов на примере Кодр (Молдавская ССР)
Authors:	М.Ф. Кошкодан, Автореферат...кандидата географических наук
Publisher: Львов, 1971
 Климат.  Молдавская ССР.
Authors:	Константинова Т.  С.,  Дубовка Ф.В.,  Кошкодан М.Ф.
Publisher:	Кишинев, 1979
 Природные условия Молдавской ССР и их хозяйственное значение: вопросы географии : межвузовский сборник
Authors:	М. Ф. Кошкодан, Институтул Педагожик де Стать "Т. Шевченко".
Publisher:	"Штиинца", 1988
, 
Length	89 pages
 Resursele naturale ale Republicii Moldova
Authors: V. Sochircă, M. Coşcodan,T. Constantinov (AŞM), C. Mihailescu 
Publisher: Î.E.P. „Ştiinţa”,. 2006, Chişinău
Length: 184 pag

References

External links 
 Tiraspol State University
 Cine au fost şi ce fac deputaţii primului Parlament din R. Moldova (1990-1994)?
 Declaraţia deputaţilor din primul Parlament
 Diplomatic Missions of Republic of Moldova Accredited Abroad

1940 births
Living people
Moldovan MPs 1990–1994
Moldova cabinets
People from Ungheni District